Glue Gun (briefly known as Glü Gun) is an American punk rock band that formed in Los Angeles in 1991 by The Grim's Bob Oedy, who is the lead singer and only constant member as of the band's reunion. To date, the band has released two full-length studio albums. They split up in 1997, but reformed in 2005, broke up again in 2006 and then reformed five years later for a second time in 2011.

History

Beginnings and Just Glü It
The band started in 1991 under the name Glue Gun with founding members: Jeff Roberts (guitars), Pete Newbury (bass), Mike  (drums) and singer Bob Oedy (previously founding guitar player of The Grim). Jeff Edwards replaced Mike  and Glue Gun made their first appearance on the "Welcome to Califucknia" compilation put out by Signal Sound Systems Records in 1992. Chris Long (guitars) joined and then the band signed a deal with Posh Boy Records. Posh Boy label owner Robbie Fields first came across the band when asked to check out another Posh Boy signing Das Klown at a small Hollywood club in 1993. Their debut album had already been recorded and was prepped for self-release when Fields urged the band to allow Posh Boy to step in and re-package the material for commercial release.  At the same time, Fields recommended to the band the alternative spelling of Glü Gun, to avoid confusion with a different New Jersey band calling themselves Glue Gun who had already asserted their claim to the name.  The album was re-sequenced and eventually released under the title Just Glü It in 1994; the album was only moderately successful. Soon after, the band reverted to using the original Glue Gun spelling.

The Scene Is Not for Sale and break up
By the end of 1994, Glue Gun regrouped and added three new band members: George Snow on guitars, John North on bass and Jody Kern on drums. Oedy and Roberts were the only two remaining members at the time. They released their second album The Scene Is Not for Sale in 1995. Although The Scene Is Not for Sale was not as successful as Just Glü It, it has been regarded by some critics as minor classic, but during its release the album received good reviews. Before their next album could be recorded, Glue Gun called it quits around 1997.

Reunion and recent activities
In 2005, Oedy reformed Glue Gun and recruited three Jughead's Revenge members Joey Rimicci (guitars), Brian Priess (bass) and Andy Alverez (drums). The band demoed ten new songs for a new album, which remains unreleased as of October 2013. In May 2006, the band posted two new songs for the upcoming release, "Plastic Bomb" (a cover of Poison Idea) and "Shadow Government", on Myspace.

The band also played two concerts in July 2006 at Harpers and the Venice Community Center, which was their first performance in ten years, and one on October 29, 2006, at the CIA in North Hollywood, California. The shows brought old fans out of the woodwork and were very successful. This also marked the first live performance for the ex Jugheads members since their breakup in 2001. After these live shows, Glue Gun parted ways again while the members continued work on their own projects.

Glue Gun announced another reunion in February 2011, this time with the Scene Is Not for Sale lineup. The band has been playing shows periodically since then, mostly in Southern California.

Line-Ups

Discography

References

External links
 Glue Gun at MySpace
 

Musical groups established in 1991
Musical groups disestablished in 1997
Musical groups reestablished in 2005
Musical groups disestablished in 2006
Musical groups reestablished in 2011
Punk rock groups from California
Hardcore punk groups from California
Musical groups from Los Angeles
Fearless Records artists
1991 establishments in California